The Flight into Death (German: Der Flug in den Tod) is a 1921 German silent drama film directed by Bruno Ziener and starring Ernst Winar, Gertrude Welcker and Josefine Dora. It premiered in Berlin on 22 July 1921.

Cast
 Gertrude Welcker   
 Ernst Winar
 Josefine Dora   
 Ernst Dernburg   
 Hans Felix   
 Mabel May-Yong

References

Bibliography
 Grange, William. Cultural Chronicle of the Weimar Republic. Scarecrow Press, 2008.

External links

1921 films
Films of the Weimar Republic
German silent feature films
German drama films
Films directed by Bruno Ziener
1921 drama films
German black-and-white films
Silent drama films
1920s German films